The 1959 Memphis State Tigers football team represented Memphis State College (now known as the University of Memphis) as an independent during the 1959 NCAA College Division football season. In its second season under head coach Billy J. Murphy, the team compiled an 6–4 record. The team played its home games at Crump Stadium in Memphis, Tennessee.

Schedule

References

Memphis State
Memphis Tigers football seasons
Memphis State Tigers football